Camp Ariel Sharon (Mahane Ariel Sharon), also called the City of Training Bases (Ir HaBahadim), is a complex of military bases being built in southern Israel, belonging to the Israel Defense Forces and named after the former Major General and Prime Minister Ariel Sharon. In total, it is a NIS 50 billion project.

Upon completion it will be the largest military base in the country, with the ability to house over 10,000 recruits in training. The base is located near Yeruham and next to the Negev Junction of roads 40 and 224.

The base will serve as an umbrella training facility, housing training bases 6, 7, 10, 11, 13, 20 and other training bases, including noncombat recruit training bases. It will cover a built-up area of

History
The project was formulated by the Planning Directorate of the Israel Defense Forces in 2002 as part of a multi-year plan. The cornerstone was laid on December 1, 2003 and the project was approved by the Israeli cabinet in April 2007.

The headquarters of the base was inaugurated in November 2014. The Adjutant Corps School will move into the base in February 2015, followed by the Military Police School.

Planning and construction
The View to the Negev concern, which comprises Minrav, Binat and Electra, is building the project and will maintain it for 25 years, at a cost of NIS 12 billion, under a private-public partnership.

The base was designed overall by the architect Ofer Kolker. Participating architectural firms include Zarhi Architects, Bar Hana Architects and the architect Shlomo Gendler.

The complex is planned to consist of 120 buildings. This includes 31 residential buildings, a dining room and kitchen, conference hall, commercial center, 12 schools, 12 technical workshops and logistics centers, 11 electrical substations, and some synagogues.

The City of Training Bases will be largely closed to private vehicles. A bike share program is being considered for the permanent staff of the base to get around. The base itself will be served by a transportation hub that will replace the existing hub in Camp Natan (Beersheba), and later by a railway line.

Environmental planning
The planning was made around the Sekher Stream which passes through the base. A hill was created from the excess earth dug up during construction. Thousands of trees and over 100,000 plants in total will be planted throughout the base. According to the landscape architect Izzy Blanc, the base will largely resemble an urban park. All of the water that will be used to water the plants will be reclaimed water.

Each building in the campus will have an energy usage meter, and planners hope that this will encourage conservation among soldiers.

Bases and facilities
The City of Training Bases will house the following military bases:
 The School for Logistics (Bahad 6), moving from Camp Yigael Yadin (Tzrifin)
 The School for Telecommunications (Bahad 7), moving from Tzrifin
 The School for Medicine (Bahad 10), moving from Tzrifin
 The Adjutant Corps School (Bahad 11), moving from Tzrifin
 The Military Police School (Bahad 13), moving from Camp Mota Gur
 The Ordnance Corps School (Bahad 20), moving from Tzrifin
 The Education Corps School, moving from Camp Sha'arei Avraham
 The Liaison (COGAT) School
 A recruit training base that will replace Camp Dotan ("Camp 80") and Batar Nitzanim

The hill made from the excess earth will contain a monument to the late Israeli general and prime minister Ariel Sharon.

Structure and command
Below is a list of commanders for the base:

Impact
The base, one of the biggest in Israel, is expect to create a large number of jobs in the remote area where it is being built, especially in Yeruham.

References

External links
 

Military installations of Israel
Southern District (Israel)
Ariel Sharon